Adi Nimni (born 27 August 1991) is an Israeli footballer.

Honours
Liga Leumit:
Runner-up (1): 2012-13
Toto Cup (Leumit):
Runner-up (1): 2012–13

Club career statistics
(correct as of April 2013)

External links
Profile at One

1991 births
Living people
Israeli Jews
Israeli footballers
Maccabi Netanya F.C. players
Hapoel Ra'anana A.F.C. players
Hapoel Ramat Gan F.C. players
Hapoel Rishon LeZion F.C. players
F.C. Tira players
Maccabi Yavne F.C. players
Israeli Premier League players
Liga Leumit players
Israeli people of Libyan-Jewish descent
Footballers from Central District (Israel)
Association football defenders